California Proposition 98 requires a minimum percentage of the state budget to be spent on K-12 education.   Prop 98 guarantees an annual increase in education in the California budget.  Prop 98, also called the "Classroom Instructional Improvement and Accountability Act," amended the California Constitution to mandate a minimum level of education spending based on three tests.  Test one, used only for 1988 to 1989, requires spending on education to make up 39% of the state budget.  Test 2, used in years of strong economic growth, requires spending on education to equal the previous years spending plus per capita growth and student enrollment adjustment.  Test 3, used in years of weak economic growth guarantees prior years spending plus adjustment for enrollment growth, increases for any changes in per capita general fund revenues, and an increase by 0.5 percent in state general funds.

This is accomplished by shifting specified amounts of property tax revenues from cities, counties and special districts to "educational revenue augmentation funds" (ERAF) to support schools statewide. Proposition 98 can be suspended only by a two-thirds vote of the California Legislature.

The initiative was a result of 1978's Proposition 13, which limited assessed property taxes to one percent of a home's value in California and thus limited the amount of local funds that could be spent on school districts.

Proposition 98 has been attacked by some groups because it mandates "auto-pilot spending" and reduces the Legislature's budgetary flexibility.

References

External links
 Proposition 98 Primer
 https://web.archive.org/web/20070814013250/http://www.edsource.org/pub_edfct_prop98.cfm
 https://web.archive.org/web/20070927082442/http://www.edsource.org/pdf/prop98_06.pdf
 http://www.pe.com/localnews/opinion/2006/education/stories/PE_OpEd_Opinion_D_op_1119_kuhn_prop98_qa_edu_loc.6204c5c.html

98
1988
Initiatives in the United States